A list of films produced by the Israeli film industry in 2009.

2009 releases

Awards

Notable deaths

 20 August – Dudu Topaz, 62, Israeli actor - suicide by hanging. (born 1946)

See also
2009 in Israel

References

External links
 Israeli films of 2009 at the Internet Movie Database

Lists of 2009 films by country or language
Film
2009